Reginald Quincy Arvizu (born November 2, 1969),  also known as "Fieldy", is an American musician, best known as the bassist for nu metal band Korn. He is also the guitarist/bassist for rock band StillWell.

Musical career
Prior to Arvizu's time in Korn, he and Brian Welch, who would later become one of Korn's two guitarists (alongside James Shaffer), had played together in a number of bands, having become friends while still at school. Upon their graduation from high school, Arvizu, Welch, Shaffer, and drummer David Silveria relocated from Bakersfield to Los Angeles and Arvizu, Shaffer, and Silveria formed L.A.P.D. (the name first stood for "Love and Peace, Dude", but this abbreviation was later changed to "Laughing As People Die"). Although L.A.P.D. did succeed in signing a record deal, their success was limited until the band hired singer Jonathan Davis and changed their name to Korn.

The name "Fieldy" is said to have come about as an inside joke. Originally, his bandmates called him "Gopher", due to his large cheeks. Gopher quickly became "Gar", Gar became "Garfield" (based on the comic strip character of the same name), and eventually "Gar" was dropped and a "y" was added to "Field", which became Fieldy.

He plays a five-string Ibanez model SDGR SR1305, named the K-5, which is his signature bass.

His playing style consists of bass-slapping, standard finger-style plucking, left-hand muting, and an ultra-scooped tone. His standard tuning is: A, D, G, C, F. He states Flea of the Red Hot Chili Peppers as being one of the main influences towards his playing style.  He has also stated to have been influenced by Billy Gould from Faith No More, Cliff Burton from Metallica and Les Claypool of Primus.

Fieldy is also one of the main songwriters in Korn. The majority of his bass riffs are hip-hop inspired. He says he gets inspiration from anything hip-hop. On the business side of Korn, Fieldy is responsible for all Korn merchandise, its buying and selling. He comes up with a number of designs, shows them to the band and they either approve or disapprove.

In August 2012 it was reported that Fieldy would be taking a brief break from Korn as his wife Dena was expecting a child. Korn began touring through Eastern Europe, Russia and India throughout August and September 2012 with fill-in bassist Ryan Martinie from Mudvayne. On June 21, 2021, Fieldy announced that he would not be accompanying Korn on their upcoming tour. In a Facebook post to fans, he stated:

Life outside Korn
In addition to Korn, he has a rap side project called Fieldy's Dreams. Fieldy's Dreams has released one album titled Rock'n Roll Gangster. Like Head, Fieldy is a Christian.

Fieldy has been married three times. He married his current wife, Dena Beber, on May 13, 2006. Fieldy has five children: two daughters, Sarina Rae (Born September 30, 1997) and Olivia Ann Marie Arvizu (Born December 9, 1998), from his second marriage to Shela Colton, and three children from his current marriage to Dena: sons Israel (Born February 9, 2007) and Noa (Born August 13, 2012), and daughter Harmony Rose Arvizu (Born November 27, 2009). Following the death of his father, Fieldy became a born again Christian.

Fieldy has stated that his second album, Bassically, was originally intended to be a hardcore rap album, but scrapped the original idea in favor of a jazz fusion style.

Fieldy worked with independent rap artist Q-Unique on a side project called StillWell. The song "Killing Myself to Live" can be heard on their MySpace page. Stillwell's debut album, Dirtbag, released in 2011.

Fieldy was also working on his own clothing line 'Immanuel one twenty three'; when asked about it while backstage at the West Palm Beach stop of the Mayhem Festival in 2010, he stated that it was "much harder than he had previously expected" to start a clothing line, and has moved on to the side project that he can "be more proud of, opposed to his first solo CD under Fieldy's Dreams titled Rock'n Roll Gangster". Got The Life: My Journey of Addiction, Faith, Recovery and Korn is a memoir Fieldy penned, which hit shelves March 10, 2009. His autobiography tells the story of how he found God, quit drugs, and found the better part of himself.

Discography

Solo albums
 Fieldy's Dreams - Rock'n Roll Gangster (January 22, 2002)
 Bassically (November 17, 2017)

L.A.P.D.
 Love and Peace, Dude EP (1989)
 Who's Laughing Now (1991)

Korn

 Neidermayer's Mind (1993)
 Korn (1994)
 Life Is Peachy (1996)
 Follow the Leader (1998)
 Issues (1999)
 All Mixed Up (EP) (1999)
 Untouchables (2002)
 Take a Look in the Mirror (2003)
 Greatest Hits Vol. 1 (2004)
 See You on the Other Side (2005)
 Live & Rare (2006)
 Untitled album (2007)
 MTV Unplugged: Korn (2007)
 Korn: Collected (2009)
 Korn Digital EP 1 (2009)
 Korn III: Remember Who You Are (2010)
 Korn Digital EP 2 (2010)
 Korn Digital EP 3 (2010)
 The Essential Korn (2011)
 The Path of Totality (2011)
 The Paradigm Shift (2013)
 The Serenity of Suffering (2016)
 The Nothing (2019)
 Requiem (2022)

StillWell
Dirtbag (2011)
Raise It Up (2015)
Supernatural Miracle (2020)

Other appearances
 Various artists – "A Song for Chi" (August 28, 2009)
 Videodrone – Videodrone (February 23, 1999)

Guest appearances (videos)
Limp Bizkit – Faith (1998)
Ice Cube – Fuck Dying (1999)
E-40 feat. Fabolous – Automatic (2002)
Bubba Sparxxx – Back in the Mud (2003)
Lil Wayne – Prom Queen (2009)

Bibliography
 Got the Life (March 10, 2009)

References

External links 

 

American autobiographers
Korn members
1969 births
Living people
20th-century American rappers
American rock bass guitarists
American heavy metal bass guitarists
American male bass guitarists
Musicians from Bakersfield, California
Alternative metal bass guitarists
Guitarists from California
21st-century American guitarists
20th-century American bass guitarists
21st-century American bass guitarists
21st-century American rappers
American Christians
StillWell members